The Nolamba dynasty the area they held sway over is referred to as Nolambasa-37 of Henjeru (Hemavathi), Nolambalige (Nolambavadi-32000), etc. R. Narasimhacharya states that the Nolambas were a native Kannada dynasty.

Officers and kings belonging to the Nolamba dynasty 

Simhapota, a Nolamba chief, subordinate to the Ganga kings.
Mahendra I, Ayyapadeva who probably ruled around the period of Krishna II of the Rastrakutas.
Anniga or Annayya with the title Bira-Nolamba ruled in the period of Amoghavarsha of Rastrakutas.
Dilipa or Iriva Nolamba around the period of Krishna III of the Rashtrakutas. According to an inscription from Aimangala, 56 Dilipa's son and successor was Nanni Nolamba.
There are two other names after Nanni Nolamba, namely Polalchora II and Vira Mahendra or Mahendra II as per Kolar district inscriptions.

As long as the Rastrakutas were strong Nolamba flourished under their influence. But after their collapse Nolamba Dynasty lost its influence and power. 
Nolambas were overrun by the Ganga king Marasimha II (963-975 CE), who boasts of having destroyed the Nolamba family and had the title Nolambakulantaka. Nanni Nolamba was the king who was ruling in c. 970 CE. Ahavamalla Nolamba appears identical with Nanni Nolamba. Mahendra II was succeeded by his younger brother Iriva Nolamba II Ghateyankakara, who was too young to come to the throne. Hence, Mahendra's mother Divabbarasi was the queen regent during this period of interregnum after his death. Rajaraja I, the Chola emperor, invaded Nolambavadi and occupied most of its southern parts. Trailokyamalla Nanni Nolamba II Pallava Permanadi succeeded Jagadekamalla Irmadi Nolamba and was installed on the throne on 5 April 1044 CE.

Other Nolamba officers listed in various inscriptions are: Irivabe-danga Nolamba Ghateyankakara, who appears to have married Pampa Devi, a daughter of Satyashraya of Western chalukyas.

The Nolamba vassal under Jayasimha of Western Chalukya was Udayaditya (about 1018–1035) also called as Vira-Nonamba Jagadekamalla Malladeva.
Jagadekamalla Immadi Nolamba Pallava Permanadi, perhaps the successor of Udayaditya, was ruling over Kadambalige in 1037.
Vijaya Pandya who ruled over Nolambavadi from Uchangi from about 1148 to about 1187.

Temples attributed to the Nolambas

 Kalleshvara Temple, Aralaguppe, Tiptur taluk
 Kalleshwara Temple, Chikkahulikunte, Sira taluk
 Nolamba Narayaneshvara temple, Avani, Mulbagal Taluk
 Siddeshwara Temple, Madhapura, Honnali taluk (Also Known as Heggeri Siddeshwara)
 Shankara muth, Avani, Mulbagal Taluk 
 Sri. Bhoga Nandeshwara, Nandi, Chikkaballapura Taluk 
 Sri.Venugopala, Tondanur, Pandavapura Taluk 
 Sri.Yoga Narasimha, Tondanur, Pandavapura Taluk 
 Siddeswara (Henjerappa) and Doddeswara Temples built by Nolamba pallava kings in the 9th century, Hemavati, Anantapur district
 Sri Veeranjaneya Swamy Temple, Aragonda Village, Chittoor Dt. Andhra Pradesh
 Sri Siddeswara Temple, Siddeswarana Durga[Kolapala] Village, Challakere Taluk, Chitradurga Dt. Karnataka dated 834AD ]

See also 

Religion in Western Ganga kingdom
Ardhagiri

References

External links 

Kolar City Municipal Council - Tourism
Kalleshwara Temple India9.com
Rashtrakuta Rulers Visitchitradurga.com

Dynasties of India
Nolambas